The Peace of Nicias was a peace treaty signed between the Greek city-states of Athens and Sparta in March 421 BC that ended the first half of the Peloponnesian War. 

In 425 BC, the Spartans had lost the battles of Pylos and Sphacteria, a severe defeat resulting in the Athenians holding 292 prisoners. At least 120 were Spartiates, who had recovered by 424 BC, when the Spartan general Brasidas captured Amphipolis. In the same year, the Athenians suffered a major defeat in Boeotia at the Battle of Delium, and in 422 BC, they were defeated again at the Battle of Amphipolis in their attempt to take back that city. Both Brasidas, the leading Spartan general, and Cleon, the leading politician in Athens, were killed at Amphipolis. By then, both sides were exhausted and ready for peace.

The negotiations were started by Pleistoanax, King of Sparta, and Nicias, an Athenian general. The most amicable proposal was to return everything to the prewar state except for Nisaea and Plataea. Athens would retain control of Nisaea and Thebes would retain control over Plataea. Amphipolis would be returned to Athens and Pylos would be returned to Sparta. Athenians would release the Spartan prisoners taken at Sphacteria and Sparta together with Thebes would return Athenian prisoners. Temples throughout Greece would be open to worshipers from all cities, and the oracle at Delphi would regain its autonomy. Athens would continue to collect tribute from the states from which it had received it since the time of Aristides, but Athens could not force them to become allies. Athens also agreed to come to Sparta's aid if the helots revolted. Few of Sparta's allies agreed to sign the peace. Boeotia, Corinth, Elis, Megara and Amphipolis opposed the treaty. 

Seventeen representatives from each side swore an oath to uphold the treaty, which was meant to last for fifty years. The Spartan representatives were the kings Pleistoanax and Agis II, Pleistolas, Damagetus, Chionis, Metagenes, Acanthus, Daithus, Ischagoras, Philocharidas, Zeuxidas, Antiphus, Tellis, Alcindas, Empedias, Menas, and Laphilus. The Athenian representatives were Lampon, Isthmonicus, Nicias, Laches, Euthydemus, Procles, Pythodorus, Hagnon, Myrtilus, Thrasycles, Theagenes, Aristocrates, Iolcius, Timocrates, Leon, Lamachus, and Demosthenes. However, Athens's chief goal, the restoration of Amphipolis, was denied when Clearidas obtained from the Spartans a clause in the treaty negating the transfer. The treaty was broken from the start and, after several more failures, was formally abandoned in 414 BC. The Peloponnesian War resumed the second stage.

See also
List of treaties

References

External links
Text of the Peace of Nicias

421 BC
Nicias
Peloponnesian War
Nicias
Nicias
5th-century BC treaties